San Andrés Tomatlán is a station on Line 12 of the Mexico City Metro. The station is located between Culhuacán and  Lomas Estrella. It was opened on 30 October 2012 as a part of the first stretch of Line 12 between Mixcoac and Tláhuac.

The station is located southeast of the city center, at the intersection between Avenida Tláhuac and Calle Luis Galvani. It is built above the ground.

The station is named after the neighborhood of San Andrés Tomatlán and the icon depicts the local church of San Andrés Apostol located just to the west of the station.

From 23 April to 22 June 2020, the station was temporarily closed due to the COVID-19 pandemic in Mexico.

Ridership

References

External links 
 

Mexico City Metro Line 12 stations
Railway stations opened in 2012
2012 establishments in Mexico
Mexico City Metro stations in Iztapalapa
Accessible Mexico City Metro stations